Brandon Michael Mann (born May 16, 1984) is an American former professional baseball pitcher. He played for the Yokohama BayStars/Yokohama DeNA BayStars and Chiba Lotte Marines of Nippon Professional Baseball (NPB) and the Texas Rangers of Major League Baseball (MLB). Mann is currently the minor league pitching coordinator for the KBO's Lotte Giants.

Career

Tampa Bay Rays
Mann attended Mount Rainier High School in Des Moines, Washington. The Tampa Bay Devil Rays selected Mann in the 27th round of the 2002 MLB draft and signed him to a $47,500 signing bonus, with an additional $40,000 for college expenses on July 7, 2002. He reached Class AA in Minor League Baseball for the Montgomery Biscuits in 2009. On November 9, 2009, Mann elected free agency.

Los Angeles Dodgers
On April 8, 2010, Mann signed a minor league contract with the Los Angeles Dodgers organization and was assigned to the Single-A Inland Empire 66ers. On August 19, 2010, Mann was released.

Southern Maryland Blue Crabs
Shortly after his release, Mann signed with the Southern Maryland Blue Crabs of the Atlantic League of Professional Baseball. On September 15, 2010, Mann earned his first win as a Blue Crab. He became a free agent after the season.

Yokohama DeNA BayStars
In 2011, Mann signed with the Yokohama BayStars of Nippon Professional Baseball (NPB). He played for the BayStars in 2012 as well, pitching to a 1.16 ERA in 2011, and a 5.32 ERA in 2012, with a 3-9 record and 59 strikeouts over two seasons.

Washington Nationals
On January 9, 2013, Mann signed a minor league contract with an invitation to spring training with the Washington Nationals.

Pittsburgh Pirates
He signed a minor league deal with the Pittsburgh Pirates on December 18, 2013. After starting the 2014 season with the Altoona Curve of the Class AA Eastern League, he was released on May 30, 2014.

Lancaster Barnstormers
After his release, Mann signed with the Lancaster Barnstormers of the independent Atlantic League of Professional Baseball for the remainder of the 2014 season. He had a 2–2 record and a 4.09 ERA in 20 games for Lancaster.

Fargo-Moorhead RedHawks
In 2015, Mann signed with the Fargo-Moorhead RedHawks of the independent American Association of Independent Professional Baseball. Mann set the American Association single-season strikeout record with 157 strikeouts in  innings pitched.

Oakland Athletics
After the season on October 6, 2015, his contract was purchased by the Oakland Athletics. On February 16, 2016, Mann received an 80-game suspension after testing positive for Ostarine, a performance-enhancing substance. After serving his suspension, he was activated on June 30 and assigned to the Arizona League Athletics. In his first start for the rookie league team, Mann pitched five innings and allowed no runs on two hits while walking two batters and striking out five. He was then promoted to the Midland RockHounds of the Class AA Texas League for his next start. On November 6, 2017, Mann elected free agency.

Texas Rangers
On January 10, 2018, Mann signed a minor league contract with the Texas Rangers. He began the season with the Round Rock Express of the Class AAA Pacific Coast League, and pitched to a 1–0 win–loss record and a 1.04 earned run average before he was promoted to MLB on May 13. He made his MLB debut that same day against the Houston Astros, pitching  innings without allowing a run. At 33 years and 362 days old, Mann became the oldest player to make his MLB debut since Chang-Yong Lim in 2013 and the oldest North American player to make his MLB debut since Alan Zinter in 2002. On August 7, 2018, Mann was designated for assignment. He became a free agent after the season.

Chiba Lotte Marines
On January 14, 2019, Mann signed with the Chiba Lotte Marines of NPB for the 2019 season. On November 30, Marines announced that team will not signed with Mann for next season. On December 2, 2019, he become free agent. In 2019 with the Marines, Mann pitched to an 0-2 record with a 3.94 ERA and 20 strikeouts.

Second Stint with Rangers
On February 7, 2020, Mann signed a minor league contract with the Texas Rangers. He was released by the Rangers organization on June 1, 2020.

Rakuten Monkeys
On August 1, 2020, Mann signed with the Rakuten Monkeys of the CPBL. In 2019 for the Monkeys, Mann pitched to a 0-2 record with a 7.08 ERA and 25 strikeouts. He became a free agent after the season.

Coaching career
On January 12, 2021, Mann was announced as the minor league pitching coordinator for the Lotte Giants of the Korea Baseball Organization.

Personal life
Mann and his wife, Sarah, were married in November 2017.
He is a devout Christian, and has noted on his profile page for Chiba Lotte Marines that Philippians 4:13 is his favorite Word in the Scriptures.

References

External links
, or NPB
 
 

1984 births
Living people
Altoona Curve players
American expatriate baseball players in Japan
American sportspeople in doping cases
Arizona League Athletics players
Baseball players from Tacoma, Washington
Baseball players suspended for drug offenses
Chiba Lotte Marines players
Fargo-Moorhead RedHawks players
Hudson Valley Renegades players
Inland Empire 66ers of San Bernardino players
Lancaster Barnstormers players
Major League Baseball pitchers
Midland RockHounds players
Montgomery Biscuits players
Nashville Sounds players
Nippon Professional Baseball pitchers
Princeton Devil Rays players
Round Rock Express players
Southern Maryland Blue Crabs players
Southwest Michigan Devil Rays players
Texas Rangers players
Visalia Oaks players
Vero Beach Devil Rays players
Yokohama BayStars players
Yokohama DeNA BayStars players